Retinoic acid early transcript 1L (RAET1L) is a cell surface glycoprotein encoded by RAET1L gene located on the chromosome 6. RAET1L is related to MHC class I molecules, but its gene maps outside the MHC locus. RAET1L is composed of the α1α2 domain and is linked to the cell membrane by the GPI anchor. It functions as a stress-induced ligand for NKG2D receptor. Its expression is, for example, triggered in course of HCMV infection, but HCMV alters its function. HCMV-encoded UL16 glycoprotein retains ULBP6 inside the cells, preventing it from reaching the cell surface and being exposed to cells of the immune system.

References

Genes
Glycoproteins